Marc Hérold Gracien (born May 5, 1983 in Saint-Marc) is a Haitian footballer.

Career

At the age of 17 in 2001, Marc-Herold Gracien was considered as the fastest player in France by beating Nicolas Anelka's record after a physical test at Clarefontaine (The National Institute of Soccer)

Youth
Gracien grew up in France and was part of storied French club Paris Saint-Germain's youth academy, where he played from the age of 14.

Professional
Gracien began his professional career in France at the age of 18, playing with lower-league sides such as La Rochelle, Les Lilas, Brive and Plessis-Robinson.

Gracien signed with the Real Maryland Monarchs in the USL Second Division in 2009, playing eight games and scoring 1 goal and one assist in his debut season with the team.

SS La Gauloise (Reunion Island Indian Ocean) played 27 games and scored 11 goals.
In January 2010, Gracien signed a 2-year contract with the Indian Ocean side. Gracien is extremely fast, very skillful and his ability to play with both feet is impressive. He has a strong strike and he is a great goal scorer.

International
Gracien made his debut for the Haiti national football team in 2004. He played the qualifying games for the 2006 FIFA World Cup and the 2009 CONCACAF Gold Cup.

References

External links
 

1983 births
Living people
Haitian footballers
Real Maryland F.C. players
USL Second Division players
ESA Brive players
FC Les Lilas players
Haitian expatriate footballers
Haitian emigrants to France
Haitian expatriate sportspeople in the United States
French expatriate sportspeople in the United States
Expatriate soccer players in the United States
Haiti international footballers
Association football midfielders
People from Saint-Marc